Svitlana Pyrkalo (born 1976, in Poltava, Ukrainian SSR) is a London-based writer, journalist and translator who writes in Ukrainian, English and Russian.

Early life and education
Svitlana Pyrkalo was born in 1976, in Poltava, Ukrainian SSR. She studied Ukrainian language at T. Shevchenko State University in Kyiv.

Career 
Svitlana Pyrkalo began her working life in the secretariat of Narodny Rukh Ukrainy, a national democratic political party in Ukraine. She subsequently became an author, journalist, and linguist.

In 2000, she became editor-in-chief of a television talk show, Without Taboo, at the Ukrainian 1+1 channel, dedicated to unusual human stories, with elements of dramatisation.

From 2007 to 2009, Pyrkalo wrote a weekly column in the Ukrainian-language magazine Glavred. From 2006 until 2010, she wrote a weekly column for the Ukrainian newspaper, Gazeta po-ukrainsky. In 2007 these collected articles, together with works of three other authors, were published as a book by Nora-druk publishers.

Until April 2011, she was a journalist and producer with the BBC Ukrainian service and presented the Friday interactive evening programme in Ukrainian from London. She is also the originator of the BBC Ukrainian annual book prize of which she is a permanent panel member.

In 2018, she was one of the Ukrainian "young intellectuals" selected to contribute an essay to New Europe, a volume initiated by the New Europe Center in Kyiv and published by Old Lion Publishing House.

In 2020, she joined the board of trustees of the Ukrainian Institute of London.

, she works for the European Bank for Reconstruction and Development.

Books
In 1998, she compiled and published The First Dictionary of Ukrainian Slang which was reviewed by Valerii Polkovsky in the Canadian Slavonic Papers who wrote that it "has no predecessors" and deserved to be translated into English. It was also reviewed in the Journal of Ukrainian Studies. It since been used and quoted by other researchers.

Her first short novel Green Margarita was described by Tamara Hundorova in the Journal of Ukrainian Studies as part of the "literature with mass appeal" after the merger of "postmodern subcultures of the 1990s", and was awarded 2nd place in a Smoloskyp publishers contest for young writers. Subsequently it was published by Smoloskyp in 2000, and has since been republished twice (2002, 2007) by two different publishers. Maria G. Rewakowicz writes in Harvard Ukrainian Studies that her "offhand and fragmentary manner of narration, quite in line with postmodernist premises, helps her to debunk the entrenched gender stereotypes and to parody the trivialities found in a number of women's magazines." Rewakowicz also describes Pyrkalo as often seen as a disciple of Oksana Zabuzhko, and writes with Alexandra Hrycak in Studies in East European Thought that Zabuzhko was proud to be a "mother figure" to her and other women writers.

In 2002, together with colleagues T. Vorozhko and M. Veresen, she published a book describing their TV experience, Without Taboo about "Without Taboo" with “Zeleny Pes” publishers.

In 2004, Pyrkalo's second novel, Don't Think About Red, was published by Fakt publishers. Rewakowicz writes, "there are obvious autobiographical parallels between the heroine and Pyrkalo, but what is particularly striking about the story as it unfolds is the easiness with which Pavlina, the main protagonist, adapts to the host country."

In 2007, Fakt also published her collection of essays on food, travel and Ukrainian identity Egoist's Kitchen. In 2007, Pyrkalo also translated into Ukrainian the novel Two Caravans by Marina Lewycka.

In 2014, her work was included in Michael M. Naydan's Herstories: An Anthology of New Ukrainian Women Prose Writers.

Selected publications
 Перший словник українського молодіжного сленгу. Vipol, Kyiv, 1998.
 Зелена Маргарита. 1999.
 Без табу про "Без Табу. Zeleny Pes, 2002. (With T. Vorozhko and M. Veresen)
 Не думай про червоне. Fakt publishers, Kyіv, 2004.
 Кухня Егоїста. 2007.

References

External links
 Official website

1976 births
Living people
British people of Ukrainian descent
Mass media people from Poltava
Ukrainian women writers
Writers from Poltava
BBC newsreaders and journalists
British women television journalists
British women radio presenters
Ukrainian radio presenters
Ukrainian women radio presenters
Ukrainian translators
Trustees of charities
Ukrainian fiction writers
Ukrainian short story writers